4th Saeima was the parliament of Latvia from 3 November 1931 until the 15 May 1934 Latvian coup d'état. It was the last democratically elected Saeima until the restoration of Latvia’s independence in 1991 and the 5th Saeima elections in 1993.
 
Social Democrat Pauls Kalniņš continued to hold the post of Speaker of the Saeima to which he was first elected during the 1st Saeima. During November 1933 – May 1934 Saeima discussed proposed Constitutional changes, submitted by Kārlis Ulmanis and his Farmers’ Union, that would reduce number of MPs from 100 to 50, allow for the direct popular election of State President and increase his powers.

4th Saeima gave confidence to the 2nd cabinet of Marģers Skujenieks (6 December 1931 – 23 March 1933), cabinet of Ādolfs Bļodnieks (24 March 1933 – 16 March 1934) and the 4th cabinet of Kārlis Ulmanis (17 March 1934 – 15 May 1934).

Elections and Parties
4th Saeima elections were held on 3–4 October 1931 and 80,04% of eligible voters participated. Due to the liberal Elections law, 27 parties and candidates lists were elected to the 100 seats, representing all the political and ethnic interest groups of Latvia. Of the 100 elected MPs, 1 was a woman, 83 were Latvians, 43 had a higher education, 39 had a secondary education, 12 had been educated at people's schools, 3 at military schools, 1 at an agricultural school, 1 at a trade school, and 1 was self-educated.
Latvian Social Democratic Workers' Party – 21 seats
Latvian Farmers’ Union – 14 seats
Latgalian Christian Peasant and Catholic Party – 8 seats
New Farmers-Small Landowners Party – 7 seats
Trade Union Workers and Peasants Group – 6 seats
Democratic Centre and Independents union - 6 seats
Latgalian Farmer-Labour Party – 5 seats
Committee of the German Baltic Parties – 5 seats
Christian National Union – 3 seats
Progressive Union – 3 seats
Party of lost money depositors and other victims – 2 seats
Agudas Israel – 2 seats
The New Farmers' Alliance – 2 seats
Russian Old Believers Working Peoples Party – 2 seats
United Polish Parties – 2 seats
Russian Orthodox and Old Believers voters and united Russian organizations list – 2 seats
Zionist Mizrahi – 1 seat
Trade Association of Railwaymen, Government Employees, Craftsmen and Workers – 1 seat
Association of Russian Peasants and Russian Public Workers - 1 seat
Union of Christian and Working Peoples – 1 seat
Union of Latgalian Latvians and Land plowers Party – 1 seat
Labour League of Latvia – 1 seat
Russian Public Workers' Association – 1 seat
Workers and Poor peasants list - 1 seat
Peace, order and production Union – 1 seat
Riga German Vidzeme list – 1 seat

References

Political history of Latvia
Saeima